College of Rhode Island may refer to:
 Brown University, name used between 1764 and 1804
 Rhode Island College, founded in 1854 as the Rhode Island State Normal School.